Gekko flavimaritus is a species of gecko, a lizard in the family Gekkonidae. The species is endemic to Thailand.

References

flavimaritus
Geckos of Thailand
Endemic fauna of Thailand
Reptiles described in 2019